The English Folk Dance and Song Society (EFDSS, or pronounced 'EFF-diss') is an organisation that promotes English folk music and folk dance. EFDSS was formed in 1932 when two organisations merged: the Folk-Song Society and the English Folk Dance Society. The EFDSS, a member-based organisation, was incorporated in 1935 and became a registered charity in 1963.

History
The Folk-Song Society, founded in London in 1898, focused on collecting and publishing folk songs, primarily of Britain and Ireland although there was no formal limitation.  Participants included: Lucy Broadwood, Kate Lee, Cecil Sharp, Percy Grainger, Ralph Vaughan Williams, George Butterworth, George Gardiner, Henry Hammond, Anne Gilchrist, Mary Augusta Wakefield, and Ella Leather.

The English Folk Dance Society was founded in 1911 by Cecil Sharp. Maud Karpeles was a leading participant. Its purpose was to preserve and promote English folk dances in their traditional forms, including Morris and sword dances, traditional social dances, and interpretations of the dances published by John Playford. The first secretary of the society was Lady Mary Hepburn-Stuart-Forbes-Trefusis; Trefusis Hall in the EFDSS HQ, Cecil Sharp House, is named after her.

One of the greatest contributions that the EFDSS made to the folk movement, both dance and song, was the folk festival, starting with the Stratford-upon-Avon Festival in the 1940s and continuing with festivals in Whitby, Sidmouth, Holmfirth, Chippenham and elsewhere.

Publications
Since 1936 the EFDSS has published English Dance & Song at least four times a year. This has become the longest-established magazine devoted to folk music, dance and song in the country. English Dance & Song is aimed at stimulating the interest of the membership of the EFDSS, as well as the wider folk music and dance community.

Their regular scholarly publication is Folk Music Journal, published annually in December, which was formerly entitled the Journal of the English Folk Dance and Song Society until 1965. The work continues the earlier journals of the two societies: Journal of the Folk-Song Society, 1899–1931; Journal of the English Folk Dance Society 191431.

Cecil Sharp House 
The Society is based at Cecil Sharp House in Camden, North London. Originally conceived as a purpose-built headquarters for the English Folk Dance Society, and now Grade II-listed, it was designed in the neo-Georgian style by architect Henry Martineau Fletcher, and opened on 7 June 1930.

The building’s most striking feature is Kennedy Hall, a large concert and performance space with a sprung ballroom floor for dancing. The space features acoustic-focused design elements, courtesy of Fletcher’s friend and fellow architect Hope Bagenal.

One wall of the hall originally accommodated a raised musicians gallery, but this was destroyed by bomb-damage in the Second World War. When the damage was repaired, in works concluding in 1954, the decision was made to commission a mural by the British abstract pastoral painter Ivon Hitchens. When unveiled, it was the largest single-wall mural in the United Kingdom.

In addition to Kennedy Hall, Cecil Sharp House contains several smaller performance and rehearsal spaces; a café and bar; and the Vaughan Williams Memorial Library and Archive. Cecil Sharp House is an active and popular venue for concerts, as well as conferences and other private functions. In 2015, the building was voted as one of London’s 20 best music venues by readers of Time Out magazine.

Recent developments

In 1998, with the folk movement strongly supported by a number of other organisations and the seeds planted by EFDSS thriving, the EFDSS altered its strategy to focus on education and archiving, with its primary goal the development of the Vaughan Williams Memorial Library as the country's national archive and resource centre for folk music, dance and song.

In 2009, the society became a regularly funded organisation (now called a National Portfolio Organisation) of Arts Council England.

In 2011 the society entered into a joint commission with Shrewsbury Folk Festival to create the Cecil Sharp Project, a multi-artist residential commission to create new works based on the life and collecting of Cecil Sharp. The project took place in March 2011, the artists involved being: Steve Knightley, Andy Cutting, Leonard Podolak, Jim Moray, Jackie Oates, Caroline Herring, Kathryn Roberts and Patsy Reid.

In 2013, EFDSS launched The Full English, an ongoing archive project supported by the Heritage Lottery Fund, The Folklore Society, the National Folk Music Fund and the English Miscellany Folk Dance Group. This free and searchable resource of 44,000 records and over 58,000 digitised images is the world's biggest digital archive of traditional music and dance tunes.

As well as folk music, the EFDSS is home to a number of performance artists, providing a regular performance platform for acts including the Ukulele Orchestra of Great Britain, the Massive Violins and the Swingle Singers.

In September 2021, EFDSS opened consultation to consider changing its name, as it was felt by some that it did not represent the aims and outlook of the society. A proposed name was 'Folk Arts England', a name formerly used between 2005 and 2014 by the Association of Festival Organisers. Of 65 members surveyed in November 2021, 74% approved this name, against other proposals such as 'Folk Arts Society'.

EFDSS Gold Badge Awards 
The EFDSS Gold Badge Award, created in 1922, is made to those deemed to have made exceptional contributions to folk music, dance, or the wider folk arts and folk community. Many past recipients are prominent figures not only within the folk community, but of wider British culture and society.

 1922  Lady Mary Trefusis; Griselda Hervey
 1923  Cecil Sharp; William Kimber
 1928  Maud Karpeles; William Wells
 1929  Helen Storrow
 1930  Winifred Shuldham-Shaw
 1934  W H Bonham Carter
 1938  Anne Gilchrist; Miss E F Lawrence
 1940  Miss C Holbrow
 1943  Dr Ralph Vaughan Williams
 1945  Miss H Cornock Keen
 1946  Lady Ampthill; Frank Howes
 1948  Frederick Keel; R J Tabor; Rev E A White
 1950  Richard Callender
 1954  Violet Alford; Elsie Avril; Marjory Sinclair
 1956  P J Terry
 1957  Janet McCrindell
 1960  Kenneth Constable; Irene Fisher; Marjorie Heffer; Dr Robert Kenworthy Schofield; George Osborne
 1961  Kathleen Adkins; Miss L Chapin; Lily Conant; May Gadd; Margaret Grant; Sybil Lightfoot; Grace Meikle; Philip Merrill; Marjorie Penn; Evelyn Wells; Elsie Whiteman
 1962  Alec Hunter
 1963  Everal de Jersey
 1964  Lady Mary Trevelyan; Dorothy Bessant
 1965  Douglas Kennedy & Helen Kennedy
 1969  Harry Cox; Arthur Marshall; Edward Nicol
 1970  Dr W Fisher-Cassie; Fred Hamer
 1971  Nan Fleming-Williams; Patrick Shuldham-Shaw
 1973  Mollie Du Cane; Dr Leonard C Luckwill
 1974  William Ganiford
 1975  A L Lloyd
 1976  Kenneth Clark; Johnson Ellwood
 1977  Stan Hugill; Rev Kenneth Loveless
 1978  Sybil Clark; Bob Copper (Copper Family); Kathleen Mitchell
 1979  Bill Rutter
 1980  Dr Russell Wortley
 1981  Dr Lionel Bacon; Bob Cann
 1982  Sam Sherry; The Watersons (Lal, Norma and Mike Waterson, John Harrison and Martin Carthy)
 1983  Nibs Matthews; Walter Pardon; The Spinners (Tony Davis, Mick Groves, Cliff Hall and Hugh Jones)
 1984  Philip Bloy; Leslie Hyner
 1986  Hugh Rippon
 1987  Reg Hall; Ewan MacCoIl; Peggy Seeger; Michael Yates
 1988  Joe Brown; Ursula Vaughan Williams
 1989  Peter Dashwood; Jack Hamilton
 1990  Tom Cook; Pat Tracey
 1995  Ivor Allsop; Liza Austin; Brenda Godrich; Cyril Jones; Fred Jordan; Harry Pitts; Rex Laycock
 1996  May Beeforth; Elsie Cloughton; Tony Foxworthy; Francis Shergold
 1997  Barbara Kinsman; Ivy Romney; Cyril Swales
 1998 Jill Copper, John Copper & Jon Dudley (Copper Family); Marjorie Fennessy; Dr Ian Russell
 1999  Roy Judge; Ron Smedley
 2001  Roy Dommett; Dr Denis Smith; Trevor Stone
 2002  Dr Christopher Cawte; John Kirkpatrick; Dave Swarbrick
 2003  Dave Arthur; Shirley Collins; Iona Opie; Roy Palmer
 2004  Steve Heap; Peter Kennedy; Geoff Rye; Malcolm Taylor
 2005  Alistair Anderson; Tony Engle; Phil Heaton; Aubrey O’Brien; Doc Rowe
 2007  Eliza Carthy; Michael Heaney; Frank Purslow; Pat Wilkinson; The Yetties (Bonny Sartin, Pete Shutler and Mac McCulloch)
 2008  Ray Fisher; John Heydon; Lou Killen; Colin Ross
 2009  Jack Brown; Beryl Marriott; Roger Nicholls; Steve Roud; Derek Schofield
 2010  Jim Coleman; Vic Gammon; John Howson; Katie Howson; Taffy Thomas
 2011  Johnny Handle; Nic Jones; George Peterson; Les Seaman; Jackie Toaduff; Eddie Upton
 2012  Bill Leader; Graeme Miles
 2013  Ashley Hutchings; Ricky Forster; David Blick
 2014  Maddy Prior; Sandra Kerr; David Leverton; Alan Bearman
 2015  Ian A. Anderson; John Tams; Rollo Woods; Paul Wilson and Marilyn Tucker (Wren Music)
 2016  Maggie Fletcher; Pete Coe and Sue Coe; Mike Wilson-Jones and Mary Wilson-Jones
 2017  Johnny Adams; Nicolas Broadbridge; Dave and Maggie Hunt; The Wilson Family
 2018  Frankie Armstrong; John Bacon; Antony Heywood; Vic Legg
 2019  Carolyn Robson; Chris Coe; John Graham; Mike Norris; Kate Rusby
 2020  Paul and Liz Davenport; Benny Graham; Mick Peat
 2021  Lynette and Jim Eldon; Kerry Fletcher; Chris Metherell; Rod Stradling
 2022  Madeleine Smith; Lawrence Heath; Roger Watson; Carol and the late Gwilym Davies

See also 
 Vaughan Williams Memorial Library
 Country Dance and Song Society, the American counterpart to the EFDSS

References

External links

English Dance and Song Magazine website

English folk dance
English folk music
English folklore
Ralph Vaughan Williams
Arts organizations established in 1932
1932 establishments in the United Kingdom
Charities based in England
History of the London Borough of Camden
Organisations based in the London Borough of Camden